Dmitriyevka is a rural locality (a village) and the administrative centre of Dmitriyevsky Selsoviet, Chishminsky District, Bashkortostan, Russia. The population was 277 as of 2010.

Geography 
It is located 25 km from Chishmy.

References 

Rural localities in Chishminsky District